Parkhead Stadium was a railway station in the east end of Glasgow. It was opened by the Caledonian Railway as Parkhead on 1 February 1897.

In recognition of its proximity to the Celtic Park football stadium, it was known as Parkhead (for Celtic Park) by 1904; and it was also referred to in some timetables as Parkhead for Celtic Park.

The station was renamed Parkhead Stadium by British Railways on 3 March 1952. The nearby ex-North British Railway's Coatbridge Branch station, "Parkhead", was renamed "Parkhead North" on 30 June 1952.

It was closed to passengers on 5 October 1964.

References

Notes

Sources
 
 
 

Disused railway stations in Glasgow
Beeching closures in Scotland
Railway stations in Great Britain opened in 1897
Railway stations in Great Britain closed in 1964
Former Caledonian Railway stations
Parkhead